Paul may refer to:

Paul (given name), a given name (includes a list of people with that name)
Paul (surname), a list of people

People

Christianity
Paul the Apostle (AD c.5–c.64/65), also known as Saul of Tarsus or Saint Paul, early Christian missionary and writer
Pope Paul (disambiguation), multiple Popes of the Roman Catholic Church
Saint Paul (disambiguation), multiple other people and locations named "Saint Paul"

Roman and Byzantine empire
Lucius Aemilius Paullus Macedonicus (c. 229 BC – 160 BC), Roman general
Julius Paulus Prudentissimus, Roman jurist
Paulus Catena (died 362), Roman notary
Paulus Alexandrinus (4th century), Hellenistic astrologer
Paul of Aegina or Paulus Aegineta (625–690), Greek surgeon

Royals
Paul I of Russia (1754–1801), Tsar of Russia
Paul of Greece (1901–1964), King of Greece

Other people

Paul the Deacon or Paulus Diaconus (c. 720 – c. 799), Italian Benedictine monk
Paul (father of Maurice), the father of Maurice, Byzantine Emperor. He served as head of the Byzantine Senate
Paul (bishop of Mérida), the metropolitan bishop of Mérida in the mid sixth century (fl. 540s/550s)
Paul (American Horror Story)
Paul Clarke from the Henderson's Boys series by Robert Muchamore
Paul (exarch) (died 8th-century), Exarch of Ravenna from 723 to 727
Paul (Life with Derek)
Paul (Meletiev)
Paul (Nestorian patriarch), briefly Patriarch of the Church of the East in 539. He is included in the traditional list of patriarchs of the Church of the East
Paul (Ponomaryov) (born 1952), emeritus Metropolitan of Minsk and Slutsk, the Patriarchal Exarch of All Belarus and the leader of the Belarusian Orthodox Church (an autonomous part of the Russian Orthodox Church)
Paul (singer) (b. 1937)
Paul, son of Peter, voivode of Transylvania between 1221 and 1222
 Paul, the name under which Sir Walter Scott wrote Paul's letters to his Kinsfolk in 1816

Places
Paul, Cornwall, a village in the civil parish of Penzance, United Kingdom
Paul (civil parish), in Cornwall, United Kingdom
Paul, Alabama, United States
Paul, Idaho, United States
Paul, Nebraska, United States
Paul, Cape Verde, part of the island of Santo Antão

Arts, entertainment and media
Paul (film), a 2011 film featuring Simon Pegg and Nick Frost 
Paul (PJ Morton album), a 2019 album
Paul (play), a 2005 play by Howard Brenton
Paul (Pokémon), a fictional character
"Paul" (song), by the German punk band Die Ärzte
St. Paul (oratorio), a work by Felix Mendelssohn originally entitled 'Paulus' (in its German version)
Poker Face Paul, a 1993 Game Gear video game that comes in blackjack and poker version
 Paul And, a 1971 album by Paul Stookey
 "Paul The Monkey", the mascot of DNA Productions
Earl Paul Hanbridge, a fictional character in the anime series Little Witch Academia

Other uses
Aichi E16A, a Japanese World War II reconnaissance floatplane, Allied code name "Paul"
Paul (bakery), a bakery franchise based in France 
Paul (nursery), a plant nursery in Hertfordshire, England
Paul the Octopus (2008–2010), an octopus that correctly guessed results in the 2010 World Cup
Paul II (octopus), the successor of Paul the Octopus
The Paul, a guitar by Gibson
Hurricane Paul (1982), a 1982 Pacific hurricane
Hurricane Paul (2006), a 2006 hurricane that struck Mexico as a tropical depression
PAUL, an abbreviation for the Portable Aqua Unit for Lifesaving

See also
Paula (disambiguation)
Saint Paul (disambiguation)

Romanian derivatives:
Păuleni (disambiguation)
Păulești (disambiguation)
Păuleasca (disambiguation)